Between 1858 and 1902, the Händel-Gesellschaft ("German Handel Society") produced a collected 105-volume edition of the works of George Frideric Handel. Even though the collection was initiated by the society, many of the volumes were published by Friedrich Chrysander working alone (Chrysander was the major contributor for almost all of the volumes). The wording on the title page of the volumes is "Georg Friedrich Händel's Werke. Ausgabe der Deutschen Händelgesellschaft" which translates as "Georg Friedrich Handel's works. Edition of the German Handel Society". Chrysander's work has been criticised, however the scale of his achievement is also praised. The collection's abbreviation of "HG" can be used to identify individual works by Handel; for example Handel's Messiah can be referred to as "HG xlv" (with the Roman numerals "xlv" indicating that the work is in volume 45). For practical use, the HG system has been superseded by the HWV numbering system. The 105 volumes do not contain the complete works of Handel—with at least 250 of his works unpublished in the collection.

History
Before the Händelgesellschaft, at least two collected editions of Handel's works had been produced. Samuel Arnold's 180-volume collection was produced between 1787 and 1797—however, it was far from complete, and included, for example, only five of Handel's 42 Italian operas. The other major collection was produced by the English Handel Society (founded by Sir George Macfarren) between 1843 and 1858—however, it too was incomplete.

In 1856, the Händel-Gesellschaft was founded by Chrysander and the literary historian Georg Gottfried Gervinus (with Chrysander the only active editor).

The society
Despite the reference to a "society" in the name of the Händel-Gesellschaft (including a board of directors), the edition was produced almost entirely by Chrysander, who carried on publication of the edition even when the society dropped out of the project. Chrysander set up an office in the garden at his home, and from 1862 onwards personally superintended the engraving and printing of the edition. Additionally, he sold fruits and vegetables raised in his garden to derive further income during the years of publication.

The first volume (1858) was prepared by Julius Rietz (although with results that displeased Chrysander). Max Seiffert assisted with some of the later editing.

Due to its being more comprehensive than previous collections, the Händel-Gesellschaft edition was long considered the standard reference for Handel's works. When the Hallische Händel-Ausgabe was inaugurated in 1955, it was at first intended as a supplement to Chrysander's work, and only later (in 1958) became a full critical edition in its own right.

Criticism
Some have criticised Chrysander's efforts, with one writer commenting that "he was an autocrat, a law into himself, who often made his selection according to his desires, who altered and revised at will, and who even falsified documents to suit his purposes," and another criticising his "arbitrary selection of material in the more complex works and his failure to explain his methods."

There are also problems such as the renumbering of the chamber sonatas originally published by Handel as his Op. 1 and Op. 2; for example, the Trio sonata in B flat for two violins and continuo, Op. 2 no. 3, appears in the Händel-Gesellschaft edition as Op. 2 no. 4. These renumberings by Chrysander resulted in confusion which still persists.

The 1911 Encyclopædia Britannica, Eleventh Edition comments that "The complete edition of the German Handelgesellschaft suffers from being the work of one man who would not recognize that his task was beyond any single man's power ... Yet Chrysander's services in the restoration of Handel are beyond praise".

Structure of the society

At the time of the publication of the first volume of the Händelgesellschaft in 1858, the society was run by directors and a committee. The following details were taken from information printed in the first volume:

Directors
The directors (German: Directorium) were:
Jul. Rietz, Vorsitzender (president)
M. Hauptmann, Secretair (secretary)
Breitkopf & Härtel, Cassirer (treasurer)
Fr. Chrysander
G. G. Gervinus

Committee
The 27 committee members (German: Ausschuss) were:

The structure of the society was printed in the following fifteen volumes: 1, 5, 9, 12, 15, 18, 21, 23, 28, 34, 36, 56, 65, 71 and 76.

Volumes
The publications were labelled as "Lieferung" (which is German for "consignment" or "delivery") followed by a Roman numeral indicating the volume number. For example, the fourth volume (containing the oratorio Hercules) was labelled as "Lieferung IV". The volumes are also sometimes referred to as "Bands".

Unless stated in the table below, Chrysander wrote a foreword for each volume. All volumes are in German, however most (again indicated below) include various English translations. Where a volume contains more than one work, the ordering of the HWV numbers indicate the order in which the works were published within the volume. The original German spelling of the volume titles has been retained.

The 105 volumes (which includes six supplement volumes) published in the Händelgesellschaft are (note that volume 49 was never published):

Unpublished
The following lists most of the HWV numbers not included in the Händelgesellschaft volumes:

See also
Händel-Werke-Verzeichnis (HWV)
Hallische Händel-Ausgabe (HHA)
Publications by Friedrich Chrysander
List of compositions by George Frideric Handel

References

External links
George Frideric Handel - Complete Works Edition at IMSLP

George Frideric Handel
Baroque music
Collected editions of classical composers
Classical music catalogues